W.O. Smith may refer to:
William Orlando Smith (1859–1932), U. S. journalist and politician
 William Oscar Smith (1917–1991), jazz double bassist
 Bill Smith (jazz musician) (born 1926), American clarinetist and composer